The , stylized as NEO•GEO and also written as NEOGEO, is a ROM cartridge-based arcade system board and fourth generation home video game console released on April 26, 1990, by Japanese game company SNK Corporation. It was the first system in SNK's Neo Geo family. 

The Neo Geo originally launched as the Multi Video System (MVS) coin-operated arcade machine. With its games stored on self-contained cartridges, a game cabinet can easily be changed to a different game title by swapping the game's cartridge and cabinet artwork. The MVS offers owners the ability to put up to six different cartridges into a single cabinet, a unique feature that was a key economic consideration for operators with limited floorspace, as well as saving money long term. 

A home console version was also made, called Advanced Entertainment System (AES). It was originally released solely as a rental console for video game stores in Japan called the Neo Geo Rental System, with its high manufacturing costs causing SNK not to release it for retail sale. This was later reversed due to high demand and it was released at retail as a luxury console. As of 2013 it was the most expensive home video game console ever released, costing . The AES had identical hardware to the MVS, allowing home users to play the games exactly as they were in the arcades. 

The Neo Geo was marketed as the first 24-bit system; its CPU is actually a 16/32-bit 68000 with an 8-bit Z80 coprocessor, while its GPU chipset has a 24-bit graphics data bus. It was a very powerful system when released, more powerful than any video game console at the time, and many arcade systems such as rival Capcom's CPS, which did not surpass it until the CP System II in 1993.

The Neo Geo MVS was a success during the 1990s due to the cabinet's low cost, multiple cartridge slots, and compact size. Several successful video game series were released for the platform, such as Fatal Fury, Art of Fighting, Samurai Shodown, World Heroes, The King of Fighters and Metal Slug. The AES had a very niche market in Japan, though sales were very low in the U.S. due to its high price for both the hardware and software, but it has since gained a cult following and is now considered a collectable. Neo Geo hardware production lasted seven years, being discontinued in 1997, whereas game software production lasted until 2004, making Neo Geo the longest supported arcade system of all time. The AES console was succeeded by the Neo Geo CD and the MVS arcade by the Hyper Neo Geo 64. As of March 1997, the Neo Geo and the Neo Geo CD combined had sold 980,000 units worldwide. In 2009, the Neo Geo was ranked 19th out of the 25 best video game consoles of all time by video game website IGN.

History

The Neo Geo hardware was an evolution of an older SNK/Alpha Denshi M68000 arcade platform that was used in Time Soldiers in 1987, further developed in the SNK M68000 hardware platform as used for P.O.W.: Prisoners of War in 1988. Contrary to other popular arcade hardware of the time, the SNK/Alpha Denshi hardware used sprite strips instead of the more common tilemap-based backgrounds. The Neo Geo hardware was essentially developed by Alpha Denshi's Eiji Fukatsu, adding sprite scaling through the use of scaling tables stored in ROM as well as support for a much higher amount of data on cartridges and better sound hardware. The system's hardware specifications were finalized in December 1989.

Takashi Nishiyama left Capcom, where he had created the fighting game Street Fighter (1987), to join SNK after they invited him to join the company. There, he was involved in developing the Neo Geo. He proposed the concept of an arcade system that uses ROM cartridges like a game console, and also proposed a home console version of the system. His reasons for these proposals was to make the system cheaper for markets such as China, Hong Kong, Taiwan, Southeast Asia, Central America, and South America, where it was difficult to sell dedicated arcade games due to piracy. Nishiyama also created the Fatal Fury fighting game franchise, as a spiritual successor to the original Street Fighter. He also worked on the fighting game franchises Art of Fighting and The King of Fighters, as well as the run and gun video game series Metal Slug.

The Neo Geo was announced and demonstrated on January 31, 1990, in Osaka, Japan. SNK exhibited several Neo Geo games at Japan's Amusement Machine Operators' Union (AOU) show in February 1990, including NAM-1975, Magician Lord, Baseball Stars Professional, Top Player's Golf and Riding Hero. The Neo Geo then made its overseas debut at Chicago's American Coin Machine Exposition (ACME) in March 1990, with several games demonstrated. The system was then released in Japan on April 26, 1990. Initially, the AES home system was only available for rent to commercial establishments, such as hotel chains, bars and restaurants. When customer response indicated that some gamers were willing to buy a  console, SNK expanded sales and marketing into the home console market in 1991.

Neo Geo's graphics and sound are largely superior to other contemporary home consoles, computers (such as the Sharp X68000) and even some arcade systems. Unlike earlier systems, the Neo Geo AES was intended to reproduce the same quality of game as the arcade MVS system. The MVS was one of the most powerful arcade units at the time, allowing the game ROM to be loaded from interchangeable cartridges instead of using custom, dedicated hardware cabinets for each game.

In the United States, the console's debut price was planned to be  and included two joystick controllers and a game: either Baseball Stars Professional or NAM-1975. Later, the Gold System was bundled with Magician Lord and Fatal Fury. At double or quadruple the price of the competition, the console and its games were accessible only to a niche market. However, its full compatibility meant that no additional money was being spent on porting or marketing for the AES, since the MVS' success was automatically feeding the AES, making the console profitable for SNK.

In January 1991, Romstar released an arcade conversion kit version of the Neo Geo in the United States, allowing the conversion of an arcade cabinet into a Neo Geo system. The same month, the Neo Geo home console version made its North American debut at the Consumer Electronics Show (CES). SNK also announced that there would generally be a roughly six-month gap between the arcade and home releases of Neo Geo games.

When real-time 3D graphics became the norm in the arcade industry, the Neo Geo's 2D hardware was unable to do likewise. Despite this, Neo Geo arcade games retained profitability through the mid-1990s, and the system was one of three 1995 recipients of the American Amusement Machine Association's Diamond Awards (which are based strictly on sales achievements). SNK developed a new console in 1994, called the Neo Geo CD. A new arcade was also made in 1997, called Hyper Neo Geo 64. However these two systems had low popularity and only a few games.

While it ceased manufacturing home consoles by the end of 1997, SNK continued making software for the original 2D Neo Geo. Despite being very aged by the end of the decade, the Neo Geo continued getting popular releases, such as the critically acclaimed The King of Fighters 2002. The last official game by SNK for the Neo Geo system, Samurai Shodown V Special, was released in 2004, 14 years after the system's introduction.

On August 31, 2007, SNK stopped offering maintenance and repairs to Neo Geo home consoles, handhelds, and games.

The Neo Geo X, an officially licensed device with a collection of Neo Geo games pre-installed, was first released in 2012 by TOMMO Inc. After just one year and a lukewarm reception due to its price and poor quality of the emulation, on October 2, 2013, SNK Playmore terminated the license agreement and demanded an immediate cease and desist of distribution and sales of all licensed products.

Reception
The Neo Geo MVS was a worldwide commercial success upon release in arcades, becoming one of the highest-earning machines at various arcades across markets such as North America and Australia in 1990. In North America, three Neo Geo games were later among the ten top-grossing arcade software conversion kits in December 1992: Art of Fighting at number one, World Heroes at number two, and King of the Monsters 2 at number ten. The Neo Geo MVS received Diamond awards from the American Amusement Machine Association (AAMA) two years in a row, for being among America's top four best-selling arcade machines of 1992 (with Street Fighter II: Champion Edition, Mortal Kombat and Terminator 2) and 1993. In 1994, the Neo Geo MVS was best-selling arcade printed circuit board (PCB) worldwide.

In the 1990 Gamest Awards, the Neo Geo received the Special Award. At the 1991 AMOA Awards held by the Amusement & Music Operators Association (AMOA), the Neo Geo won the "Most Innovative New Technology" award.

In a 1993 review, GamePro gave the Neo Geo a "thumbs up". Though they voiced several criticisms, noting that the system was not as powerful as the soon-to-launch 3DO and had few releases which were not fighting games, they generally praised both the hardware and games library, and recommended that gamers who could not afford the console (which was still priced at $649.99) play the games in the arcade.

Technical details

Each joystick controller is 280mm (width) × 190mm (depth) × 95mm (height) ( 11 × 8 × 2.5 in.) and contains the same four-button layout as the arcade MVS cabinet.

The arcade machines have a memory card system by which a player could save a game to return to at a later time and could also be used to continue play on the SNK home console of the same name.

The arcade version of the video game hardware is often referred to as the "MVS," or Multi Video System (available in 1-slot, 2-slot, 4-slot, and 6-slot variations, differing in the amount of game cartridges loaded into the machine at the time), with its console counterpart referred to as the "AES", or Advanced Entertainment System. Early motherboard revisions contain daughterboards, used to enhance the clarity of the video output.

The MVS and AES hardware can execute identical machine code. Owners can move EPROMs from one type to the other, and the game will still run. The program specifics for both MVS and AES game options are contained on every game ROM, whether the cartridge is intended for home or arcade use. However, the arcade and home cartridges do have a different pinout. They were designed this way to prevent arcade operators from buying the cheaper home carts and then using them in arcades. In a few home version games, the arcade version of the game can be unlocked by inputting a special code.

ROM sizes and startup screens
The original specification for ROM size is up to 330 megabits, hence the system displaying "Max 330 Mega Pro-Gear Spec" upon startup. While no technical advances were required to achieve it, some games over 100 megabits, such as Top Hunter, followed this screen by displaying an animation proclaiming "The 100Mega Shock!". The original ROM size specification was later enhanced on cartridges with bank switching memory technology, increasing the maximum cartridge size to around 716 megabits. These new cartridges also cause the system to display "Giga Power Pro-Gear Spec" upon startup or during attract mode, indicating this enhancement.

Specifications

The system uses seven different specialist processors, which divide the workload for the visuals, audio and gameplay.

CPU
 Main CPU processor: Motorola 68000 (often a second sourced version, usually by Toshiba or Hitachi, initially a Hitachi HD68HC000PS12) @ 12 MHz (16/32-bit instructions @ 1.75 MIPS)
 CPU co-processor: Zilog Z80 @ 4 MHz (also used as audio controller) (8/16-bit instructions @ 0.58 MIPS)

Memory
RAM: 214 KB SRAM
 Main 68000 RAM: 64 KB (32 KB SRAM ×2)
 Video RAM: 84 KB SRAM
 Main VRAM: 64 KB (32 KB SRAM ×2)
 Palette memory: 16 KB (8 KB SRAM ×2)
 Fast video sprite RAM: 4 KB (2 KB SRAM ×2)
 Z80 sound RAM: 2 KB SRAM
 Battery-backup save NVRAM: 64 KB SRAM

On-board ROM: 512 KB
Zoom look-up table: 128 KB
Fix layer graphics: 128 KB
Z80 sound: 128 KB
68000 BIOS: 128 KB

Display
The SNK custom video chipset allows the system to draw sprites in vertical strips which are 16 pixels wide, and can be 16 to 512 pixels tall; it can draw up to 96 sprites per scanline for a total of 380 sprites on the screen at a time. Unlike most other video game consoles of its time, the Neo Geo does not use scrolling tilemap background layers. Instead, it has a single non-scrolling tilemap layer called the fix layer, while any scrolling layers rely exclusively on drawing sprites to create the scrolling backgrounds (like the Sega Y Board). By laying multiple sprites side by side, the system can simulate a tilemap background layer. The Neo Geo sprite system represents a step between conventional sprites and tilemaps.

 GPU chipset:
 SNK LSPC2-A2 (line sprite generator & VRAM interface) @ 24 MHz
 SNK PRO-B0 (palette arbiter)
 SNK PRO-A0, NEO-B1, NEO-GRC
 GPU graphics data bus: 24-bit
 Display resolution: 320×224 px (many games only use the centermost 304 px), progressive scan
 Color palette: 65,536 (16-bit) (not RGB565, but RGB666, where the lowest bit of each channel is shared, being common to the three RGB components)
 Maximum colors on screen: 4096 (12-bit)
 Maximum sprites on screen: 380
 Minimum sprite size: 16×16 px
 Maximum sprite size: 16×512 px
 Maximum sprites per scanline: 96
 Maximum sprite pixels per scanline: 1536 px
 Static tilemap plane: 1 (512×256 px fix layer)
 Background planes: Up to 3 planes, which enable parallax scrolling (large sprites can be chained together to make objects that function similarly to tilemap backgrounds)
 Aspect ratio: 4:3
 A/V output: RF, composite video/RCA audio, RGB (with separate 21 pin RGB cable FCG-9, or European standard RGB SCART cable).

Sound
The onboard Yamaha YM2610 sound chip gives the system 15 channels of sound.

 Sound chip: Yamaha YM2610
 4 concurrent FM synthesis channels (voices), four operators per channel
 3 SSG channels
 1 programmable noise channel
 7 pulse-code modulation (PCM) channels
 ADPCM-A: 6 ADPCM channels, 18.5 kHz sampling rate, 12-bit audio depth
 ADPCM-B: 1 ADPCM channel,  1.85–55.5 kHz sampling rate, 16-bit audio depth
 2 interval timers
 1 low frequency oscillator (LFO)
 Sound/Work RAM: 2KB
 Sound ROM: 128 KB on-board (only less than 32 KB used), up to 512 KB sound ROM on cartridges

Other
Power
 Source: separate DC 5 V (older systems) and DC 9 V adapter (newer systems).
 Consumption: 8 W older Systems, 5 W newer Systems

Dimensions
 Console: 325 mm (width) × 237 mm (depth) × 60 mm (height).
 Controller: 280 mm (width) × 190 mm (depth) × 95 mm (height).

Console storage

 Removable memory card: 2KB or 68-pin JEIDA ver. 3 spec memory.  Any 68-pin memory that fits the JEIDA version 3 spec will work.

Arcade storage

 Removable memory card: 68-pin.  Cartridge is composed of 2 PCBs.

Legacy
The Neo Geo is the first home game console to feature a removable memory card for saved games.

The GameTap subscription service has included a Neo Geo emulator and a small library of Neo Geo games.  In 2007 Nintendo announced that Neo Geo games would appear on the Wii's Virtual Console, starting with Fatal Fury: King of Fighters, Art of Fighting, The King of Fighters '94, and World Heroes. Neo Geo games were released through Xbox Live Arcade and PlayStation Network (For the PlayStation 3/PlayStation Network, the service was called NEOGEO Station), including Fatal Fury Special, Samurai Shodown II, Metal Slug 3, Garou: Mark of the Wolves and The King of Fighters '98. Many Neo Geo games were released on the PlayStation 4, Xbox One, Windows, and Nintendo Switch through the Arcade Archives service.

Homebrew activity began after the console's discontinuation, both by noncommercial hobbyists and commercially.

Neo Geo has a community of collectors. Because of the limited production runs received by cartridges amongst the sizable available arcade library, some of the rarest Neo Geo games can sell for well over $1,000. The most valuable game is the European AES version of Kizuna Encounter. The MVS market provides a cheaper alternative to the expensive and rare home cartridges, and complete arcade kits are priced at a premium. It is also possible to play the MVS cartridges, which generally cost much less, on the AES home system through the use of adapters.

See also

 Arcade system board: SNK
 CP System
 Neo Geo CD
 DECO Cassette System
 Taito B System
 List of Neo Geo games
 List of Sega arcade system boards

Notes

References

External links

 
 NEOGEO Museum
 A complete software and artwork resource for the Neo Geo
 The NeoGeo Development Wiki
 Video of Neo Geo AES hardware and features from FamicomDojo.TV

Products introduced in 1990
Products introduced in 1991
Computer-related introductions in 1990
Computer-related introductions in 1991
Products and services discontinued in 2004
Arcade system boards
Home video game consoles
Fourth-generation video game consoles
Regionless game consoles
SNK
 
1990s toys
2000s toys
68k-based game consoles